Sam Gilliam (November 30, 1933 – June 25, 2022) was an American color field painter and lyrical abstractionist artist. Gilliam was associated with the Washington Color School, a group of Washington, D.C.-area artists that developed a form of abstract art from color field painting in the 1950s and 1960s. His works have also been described as belonging to abstract expressionism and lyrical abstraction. He worked on stretched, draped and wrapped canvas, and added sculptural 3D elements. He was recognized as the first artist to introduce the idea of a draped, painted canvas hanging without stretcher bars around 1965. This was a major contribution to the Color Field School and has had a lasting impact on the contemporary art canon. Arne Glimcher, Gilliam's art dealer at Pace Gallery, wrote following his death that "His experiments with color and surface are right up there with the achievements of Rothko and Pollock."

In his later work, Gilliam  worked with polypropylene, computer-generated imaging, metallic, and iridescent acrylics, handmade paper, aluminum, steel, plywood, and plastic.

Biography
Sam Gilliam was born in Tupelo, Mississippi, on November 30, 1933, the seventh of eight children born to Sam and Estery Gilliam. The Gilliams moved to Louisville, Kentucky, shortly after he was born. His father worked on the railroad; his mother cared for the large family. At a young age, Gilliam wanted to be a cartoonist and spent most of his time drawing. He attended Central High School in Louisville and graduated in 1951.

After high school, Gilliam attended the University of Louisville and received his B.A. degree in fine arts in 1955 as a member of the second admitted class of black undergraduate students. In the same year he held his first solo art exhibition at the University. From 1956 to 1958 Gilliam served in the United States Army. He returned to the University of Louisville in 1961 and, as a student of Charles Crodel, received his M.A. degree in painting. While attending college he befriended painter Kenneth Victor Young.

Gilliam listened to his college professor's advice to become a high school teacher and was able to teach art at Washington's McKinley High School. Gilliam was devoted to developing his painting during his weekdays reserved for the classroom. In 1962, Gilliam moved to Washington, D.C., after marrying Washington Post reporter Dorothy Butler who is also the first African American female reporter at the Washington Post. Later Gilliam lived in Washington, D.C., with his long-time partner, Annie Gawlak. They were married in 2018 after a 35-year partnership.

Career in the 1960s, early 1970s
During the social upheaval of the 1960s in the United States, Gilliam began painting works that were abstract but still made bold, declarative statements, inspired by the specific conditions of the African-American experience. This was at a time that "abstract art was said by some to be irrelevant to black African life." Abstraction remained a critical issue for artists such as Gilliam. His early style developed from brooding figural abstractions into large paintings of flatly applied color, pushing Gilliam to eventually remove the easel by eliminating the stretcher. During this time period, Gilliam painted large color-stained canvases, which he draped and suspended from the walls and ceilings, comprising some of his best-known artwork.

Gilliam was influenced by German Expressionists such as Emil Nolde, Paul Klee, and the American Bay Area Figurative School artist Nathan Oliveira. His early influences included Morris Louis and Kenneth Noland. He said that he found many clues about how to go about his work from Vladimir Tatlin, Frank Stella, Hans Hofmann, Georges Braque, Pablo Picasso, and Paul Cézanne. In 1963, Thomas Downing, an artist who identified himself with the Washington Color School, introduced Gilliam to this new school of thought. Around 1965, Gilliam became the first painter to introduce the idea of the unsupported canvas. He was inspired to do this by observing laundry hanging outside his Washington studio. His drape paintings were suspended from ceilings or arranged on walls or floors, representing a sculptural third dimension in painting. Gilliam said that his paintings are based on the fact that the framework of the painting is in real space. He was attracted to its power and the way it functioned. Gilliam's draped canvases change in each environment where they are arranged and frequently he embellished the works with metal, rocks, and wooden beams. He received countless public and private commissions for these draped canvases which earned him the title of the "father of the draped canvas". One of his last, and largest, works within this series was titled Seahorses (1975), made for the Philadelphia Museum of Art. The work consisted of six parts and was made of hundreds of feet of canvas hung on the outside walls of the museum.

During the 1960s, Gilliam also experimented with beveled-edge paintings, often using acrylic paint to color over the edges of the canvas onto the frames of the painting. Similarly to his drape paintings, these beveled paintings blurred the line between sculpture and paintings, while retaining a distinct commitment to abstraction.

In 1971, he boycotted an event at the Whitney Museum, in New York, in support of and in solidarity with the Black Emergency Cultural Coalition as a protest against the museum for failing to consult with black art experts in selecting art for the show.

In 1972, Gilliam represented the United States at the 36th Venice Biennale in a group show curated by Walter Hopps. His draped canvas Baroque Cascade (1968) was exhibited at the show, a multi-canvas installation that stretched over 75 feet before being hung from the rafters in the exhibition hall. The work had originally been shown at the Corcoran Gallery in 1969 in a show of Gilliam's work organized by Hopps. Gilliam was the first African-American artist to show at the Biennale for the United States, although no African-American artist represented the US with a solo show until Robert Colescott's solo exhibition in 1997.

Career in the 1970s and 1980s

In 1975, Gilliam veered away from the draped canvases, and became influenced by jazz musicians such as Miles Davis and John Coltrane.  He started producing dynamic geometric collages, which he called "Black Paintings" because they are painted in shades of black. Works like Rail (1977) typify this style, with thick layers of black paint and outlines of sharp geometric shapes.

In the 1980s Gilliam's style changed dramatically once more, transitioning to paintings reminiscent of African patchwork quilts from his childhood, using an improvisational approach. These works often included multiple canvases carved into geometric shapes and combined into a single form. The transition between his "Black Paintings" and quilt-inspired paintings can be seen in his Wild Goose Chase series.

Later career

In the late 1980s and 1990s, Gilliam was largely overlooked by the institutional art world. He showed his work very infrequently outside of Washington, D.C., during this time, as a result of both his desire to work in his own community and a decline in interest from critics and museums in New York. Despite this isolation from a broader audience, he continued to produce paintings in new forms and developed new approaches to abstraction, including experimentation with metal forms and the use of washi paper to create sculptural works, and exhibited extensively in D.C. and across the Southeast. In 2019, journalist Greg Allen wrote about Gilliam's insulation from mainstream art spaces in Art in America, saying "if, at some periods in his extensive career, Gilliam seemed invisible, it’s simply because people refused to see him." Gilliam himself said in 1989 that "I’ve learned the difference between what is really good and real for me and what is something that I dreamed would be real and good for me. I’ve learned to — I don’t mean to say I’ve learned to love this — but I’ve learned to accept this, the matter of staying here."

Beginning in the 2000s, Gilliam's career saw a marked resurgence in critical and institutional attention, starting with his first full-scale retrospective at the Corcoran Gallery in 2005. In 2012, Los Angeles-based gallerist David Kordansky visited Gilliam in Washington with the artist Rashid Johnson to offer representation and begin planning an exhibition, a request that reportedly moved Gilliam to tears. Kordansky subsequently helped place major works by the artist in high-profile institutions like the Museum of Modern Art and Metropolitan Museum of Art and organized several exhibitions of Gilliam's work.  Throughout the 2000s and 2010s Gilliam participated in a large number of high-profile solo and group shows, including exhibiting at the Venice Biennale for a second time in 2017, in the Giardini's central pavilion for the show Viva Arte Viva. His work Yves Klein Blue (2017), a large-scale draped painting, was hung outside the entrance of the venue. His first European retrospective, Sam Gilliam: Music of Color, was hosted in 2018 by the Kunstmuseum Basel. In 2019 Gilliam acquired representation through a New York-based gallery for the first time, Pace Gallery.

In 2022, one month before his death, he debuted a series of tondo paintings in a solo show at the Hirshhorn Museum and Sculpture Garden in Washington, D.C. The abstract paintings, the first of Gilliam's works in the tondo form, are circular canvases in beveled frames containing fields of color, sometimes overflowing onto the frames themselves. The paintings' beveled frames represented a return to a form the artist had originally explored in the 1960s and 1970s.

Recognition
Gilliam had many commissions, grants, awards, and honorary doctorates.

His honors included eight honorary doctorates, and the Kentucky Governor's Award in the Arts. He received several National Endowment for the Arts grants, the Longview Foundation Award, and a Guggenheim Fellowship. He also received the Art Institute of Chicago's Norman W. Harris Prize, and an Artist's Fellowship from the Washington Gallery of Modern Art. He was named the 2006 University of Louisville Alumnus of the Year.

In 1987 Gilliam was selected by the Smithsonian Art Collectors Program to produce a print to celebrate the opening of the S. Dillon Ripley Center in the National Mall. He donated his talent to produce In Celebration, a 35-color limited-edition serigraph that highlighted his trademark use of color. The sale benefited the Smithsonian Associates, the continuing education branch of the larger Smithsonian Institution. In early 2009, he again donated his talents to the Smithsonian Associates to produce a 90-color serigraph entitled Museum Moment, which he described as "a celebration of art".

In April 2003, a dedication of the installation of Gilliam's work, Matrix Red-Matrix Blue, was held at Rutgers Law School, Newark. In May 2011, his work From a Model to a Rainbow was installed in the Washington Metro Underpass at 4th and Cedar, NW.

In January 2015, Gilliam was awarded the Medal of Art by the U.S. State Department for his longtime contributions to Art in Embassies and cultural diplomacy. His work was shown in embassies and diplomatic facilities in over 20 countries during his career.

In 2016, Gilliam was commissioned to produce a piece as part of the grand opening of the National Museum of African American History and Culture (NMAAHC). His 2019 exhibition at Dia:Beacon included paintings described by The Wall Street Journal as "innovative, loosely draped work" that were "a light and luminous addition to the galleries."

Personal life
In 1962, Gilliam married Dorothy Butler, a Louisville native and the first African-American female columnist at The Washington Post. They divorced in the 1980s but have three daughters (Stephanie, Melissa, and Leah) and also have three grandchildren. After the divorce he met Annie Gawlak, owner of the former G Fine Art gallery in Washington, D.C. The pair were married in 2018 after having been together in a 35-year partnership.

Gilliam died of renal failure at his home in Washington, D.C., on June 25, 2022, at the age of 88.

Selected public artwork
 Solar Canopy (1986)

Solar Canopy is an aluminum sculpture made by  Gilliam in 1986. It is a large 34'x 12'x 6" feet painted sculpture located at York College, City University of New York's Academic Core Lounge on the third floor across a huge open window. The artwork is made up of painted geometric shapes with many vibrant colors, some having a solid color while others have a tie-dye effect painted on them. The artwork is connected together in a horizontal diagonal with a circular shape in the middle. The circular middle is red on the outside and underneath is painted with many different colors in a tie-dye effect. It also has small blocks under it painted in solid colors of red, orange, blue, and yellow. Attached to some of the small blocks are triangular blocks.

 Jamaica Center Station Riders, Blue (1991)
 

Located at the Jamaica Center train station (E,J,Z) Jamaica Center Station Riders, Blue is a large aluminum sculpture mounted high outside on a wall above one of the entrances. The Metropolitan Transportation Authority Arts for Transit project commissioned the work in 1991. It is made up of geometric shapes painted in solid primary colors (red, yellow, blue). The shape of the overall sculpture is circular, with the outer part being blue while the inner parts are red and yellow. In the artist's words, the work "calls to mind movement, circuits, speed, technology, and passenger ships...the colors used in the piece... refer to colors of the respective subway lines. The predominant use of blue provides one with a visual solid in a transitional area that is near subterranean."

Exhibitions
Gilliam staged a large number of solo shows in the United States and internationally. His solo shows include Paintings by Sam Gilliam (1967), The Phillips Collection, Washington, D.C.; Projects: Sam Gilliam (1971), Museum of Modern Art, New York; Red & Black to “D”: Paintings by Sam Gilliam (1982–1983), Studio Museum in Harlem, New York; Sam Gilliam: Construction (1996), Speed Art Museum, Louisville, Kentucky; Sam Gilliam in 3-D (1998-1999), Kreeger Museum, Washington, D.C.; Sam Gilliam: A Retrospective (2005–2007), originating at the Corcoran Gallery of Art, Washington, D.C.; Sam Gilliam (2017), Seattle Art Museum; and Sam Gilliam: The Music of Color (2018), Kunstmuseum Basel, Switzerland, the artist's first solo museum exhibition in Europe. Following Gilliam's decision to join Pace Gallery in 2019, he staged several solo exhibitions in quick succession, including Existed Existing (2020), his first solo exhibition of new work in New York in over 20 years, and Sam Gilliam (2021), his first solo exhibitions in Asia, hosted at Pace's Seoul and Hong Kong locations.

The first major American museum retrospective of Gilliam's work in nearly two decades was scheduled to open in 2020 at the Hirshhorn Museum and Sculpture Garden in Washington, D.C., but was rescheduled to 2022 due to the COVID-19 lockdowns. The show, Sam Gilliam: Full Circle, opened in May 2022 as an exhibition of works the artist had produced almost exclusively during the COVID-19 pandemic, instead of a broader retrospective as originally planned. Full Circle was Gilliam's final show during his lifetime, opening one month before his death.

The first posthumous solo exhibition of Gilliam's work, Late Paintings, opened at Pace's London gallery in October 2022. Late Paintings was the final show Gilliam had planned during his life and was his first solo exhibition in the United Kingdom.

He also participated in many group exhibitions, including The De Luxe Show (1971), DeLuxe Theater, Houston; the 36th Venice Biennale (1972); Gilliam/Edwards/Williams: Extensions (1974), Wadsworth Atheneum, Hartford, Connecticut; the Marrakech Biennale (2016); and the 57th Venice Biennale (2017).

Notable works in public collections

 Long Green (1965), Anacostia Community Museum, Smithsonian Institution, Washington, D.C.
 Shoot Six (1965), National Gallery of Art, Washington, D.C.
 They Sail (1966), The Phillips Collection, Washington, D.C.
 Red Petals (1967), The Phillips Collection, Washington, D.C.
 Carousel State (1968), Metropolitan Museum of Art, New York
 Double Merge (Carousel I and Carousel II) (1968), Museum of Fine Arts, Houston, and Dia Art Foundation, New York (jointly owned)
 Relative (1968), National Gallery of Art, Washington, D.C.
 Restore (1968), Speed Art Museum, Louisville, Kentucky
 10/27/69 (1969), Museum of Modern Art, New York
 April 4 (1969), Smithsonian American Art Museum, Smithsonian Institution, Washington, D.C.
 Dakar I (1969), Philadelphia Museum of Art
 Green April (1969), Kunstmuseum Basel, Switzerland
 Light Depth (1969), Hirshhorn Museum and Sculpture Garden, Smithsonian Institution, Washington, D.C.
 Swing (1969), Smithsonian American Art Museum, Smithsonian Institution, Washington, D.C.
 Basque 1 Range (1970), Pérez Art Museum Miami
 Change (1970), Mumok, Vienna, Austria
 Change (1970), Louisiana Museum of Modern Art, Humlebæk, Denmark
 Leaf (1970), Dallas Museum of Art
 Simmering (1970), Tate, London
 Carousel Merge (1971), Walker Art Center, Minneapolis
 Carousel Merge 2 (1971), Milwaukee Art Museum
 Day Tripper (1971), Carnegie Museum of Art, Pittsburgh
 Rondo (1971), Kunstmuseum Basel, Switzerland
 Wide Narrow (1972), Rose Art Museum, Waltham, Massachusetts
 "A" and the Carpenter I (1973), Art Institute of Chicago
 N°1 D (1977), Musée d'Art Moderne de Paris
 Rail (1977), Hirshhorn Museum and Sculpture Garden, Smithsonian Institution, Washington, D.C.
 Eiler Blues (1978), Madison Museum of Contemporary Art, Wisconsin
 Untitled (Black) (1978), Whitney Museum, New York
 Triple Variants (1979), Richard B. Russell Federal Building, Atlanta (General Services Administration)
 The Arc Maker I & II (1981), Detroit Institute of Arts
 Master Builder Pieces and Eagles (1981), Studio Museum in Harlem, New York
 Red & Black (1981), Indianapolis Museum of Art
 To Braque for Mantelpieces (1982), Cleveland Museum of Art
 Sculpture with a D (1980-1983), Davis station, Massachusetts Bay Transportation Authority, Boston
 Solar Canopy (1986), York College, City University of New York
 Purple Antelope Space Squeeze (1987), Milwaukee Art Museum
 The Petition (1990), Smithsonian American Art Museum, Smithsonian Institution, Washington, D.C.
 Jamaica Center Station Riders, Blue (1991), Jamaica Center–Parsons/Archer station, Metropolitan Transportation Authority, New York
 Running Naked (1991), Minneapolis Institute of Art
 Daily Red (1998), Anacostia Community Museum, Smithsonian Institution, Washington, D.C.
 Graining (1998), Kreeger Museum, Washington, D.C.
 Chair Key (2002), Philander Smith College, Little Rock, Arkansas
 Blue (2009), Pennsylvania Academy of the Fine Arts, Philadelphia
 From Model to Rainbow (2011), Takoma station, Washington Metropolitan Area Transit Authority
 Yet Do I Marvel (Countee Cullen) (2016), National Museum of African American History and Culture, Smithsonian Institution, Washington, D.C.

Citations

General and cited references 
 Sam Gilliam: a retrospective, October 15, 2005, to January 22, 2006, Corcoran Gallery of Art
 Binstock, Jonathan P., and Sam Gilliam. 2005. Sam Gilliam: a retrospective. Berkeley: University of California Press. 
 Sam Gilliam papers, 1958–1989, Archives of American Art, Smithsonian Institution
 AskArt lists 52 references to Sam Gilliam
 Washington Art, catalog of exhibitions at State University College at Potsdam, NY & State University of New York at Albany, 1971, Introduction by Renato G. Danese, printed by Regal Art Press, Troy NY.

External links

 Sam Gilliam Papers, 1957–1989. Archives of American Art, Smithsonian Institution.
 "Sam Gilliam" files, Thelma & Bert Ollie Memorial Collection of Abstract Art by Black Artists: Files for Research and Education, Museum Archives, Saint Louis Art Museum
 Gilliam's Newest Work Inspires Dickstein Shapiro, Washingtonian magazine
 Sam Gilliam at the National Gallery of Art
 Sam Gilliam Lecture, March 9, 1977, from Maryland Institute College of Art's Decker Library, Internet Archive
 Sam Gilliam at the Minneapolis Institute of Art, Minneapolis, MN
 Sam Gilliam "Existed Existing" at Pace Gallery

1933 births
2022 deaths
20th-century African-American painters
20th-century American male artists
20th-century American painters
20th-century American printmakers
21st-century African-American artists
21st-century American painters
African-American contemporary artists
African-American printmakers
American contemporary artists
American contemporary painters
American male painters
Artists from Louisville, Kentucky
Artists from Mississippi
Artists from Washington, D.C.
Central High School (Louisville, Kentucky) alumni
Deaths from kidney failure
Modern painters
Painters from Kentucky
People from Tupelo, Mississippi
University of Louisville alumni